Colonel James Helms Kasler (May 2, 1926 – April 24, 2014) was a senior officer in the United States Air Force and the only person to be awarded the Air Force Cross three times. The Air Force Cross ranks just below the Medal of Honor as an award for extraordinary heroism in combat.

Kasler was a combat veteran of World War II, the Korean War, and the Vietnam War. In Korea, as an F-86 Sabre pilot with the 4th Fighter-Interceptor Wing, he was recognized as an ace, credited with shooting down 6 MiG-15s. Kasler flew a combined 198 combat missions and was a prisoner of war in North Vietnam from August 1966 until March 1973.

He flew a total of 101 combat missions in an F-86E Sabre and scored 6 confirmed air-to-air victories and two more damaged against MiG-15s, becoming among the first jet aces of the Korean War.

Early life and education 
Kasler was born May 2, 1926, in South Bend, Indiana. After enlisting in the U.S. Army Reserve on November 24, 1943, he went on active duty with the U.S. Army Air Forces on May 16, 1944.

He earned his bachelor's degree in June 1963 from the University of Nebraska-Omaha.

Vietnam War

Kasler was deployed directly to Southeast Asia. He served as an F-105 pilot with the 354th Tactical Fighter Squadron of 335th Tactical Fighter Wing at Takhli Royal Thai Air Force Base at Thailand, in February 1966. By August 1966, an article in Time Magazine labeled him "the hottest pilot" in Vietnam and his wingmates called him "a one-man Air Force".

Prisoner of war

While flying F-105D-31-RE Thunderchief 62–4343 on his 91st combat mission on August 8, 1966, Kasler was awarded a second Air Force Cross as leader of a formation that was evaluating low-level delivery against a priority target. When his wingman, 1st Lt Fred R. Flom was hit and ejected, Major Kasler located the downed pilot, flew cover at low altitude until his fuel was almost gone, refueled with an aerial tanker, and returned to direct rescue operations. Flying at treetop level in an attempt to relocate his wingman, Kasler's F-105 was disabled by ground fire. He ejected, was captured and singled out for special attention by his captors and tortured repeatedly to get him to cooperate with their propaganda efforts.

For more than a month in 1967, Kasler was the target of nearly continuous daily torture. He received his third award of the Air Force Cross for resisting torture inflicted on him over a two-month period during the summer of 1968 in an attempt to coerce his cooperation with visiting anti-war delegations and propaganda film makers.

Kasler described his worst treatment:

At one point, during the fall of 1967, Kasler's captors took his clothes and his mosquito net. For three days, they denied him food and water and they beat his back and buttocks with a truck fan belt, every hour on the hour, 6 a.m. until 10 or 11 p.m. His torturer asked if he surrendered. Kasler finally gasped yes.

The guard nicknamed "Fidel" by the POWs returned to Kasler's cell the next day and demanded that he surrender. Kasler refused and the beatings resumed and continued for another two days. Kasler suffered a fractured rib, a ruptured eardrum and broken teeth. He was left with the skin hanging off his rear end down to the floor. His face was so swollen, it hung like a bag, his eyes almost shut. Kasler's mangled and infected leg, which tormented him throughout his captivity and for years afterward, swelled to the point he feared it would explode.

He was finally released on March 4, 1973, during Operation Homecoming, after spending 2,401 days in captivity.

Later life
Kasler was married to his wife, Martha (Rankin), for 65 years. She had moved to Indianapolis from Macomb, Illinois, as an eighth-grader. They had a daughter Suzanne and twins James and Nanette. Suzanne operates a nationally known interior design firm in Atlanta and Nanette is the owner of NKL Designs. They have four grandchildren.

He spent the last 39 years of his life as a resident of Momence, Illinois, where he owned and developed South Shore Golf Course in Momence and had interests in banking and real estate, served on a number of boards and received a variety of civic and service awards.

In 1973, Kasler received the Academy of Achievement’s Golden Plate presented by Lowell Thomas at an awards ceremony in Chicago.

In 2007, Kasler appeared on an episode of the History Channel series Dogfights. In the episode, titled 'No Room for Error', Kasler's "May 15, 1952 mission", where he shot down two MiG-15s, action is depicted. The episode was the eighth episode of the second season of the series, which recreated historical air combat campaigns using modern computer graphics.

On 15 September 2007 the United States Air Force dedicated a monument to him.  He and his wife Martha resided in Illinois.

Kasler died April 24, 2014, in West Palm Beach, Florida and is buried with full military honors at Crown Hill Cemetery.

Awards and decorations 
Included among his 76 awards for valor and service, in addition to receiving three awards of the Air Force Cross, Kasler was decorated twice with the Silver Star and awarded a Legion of Merit, nine Distinguished Flying Crosses, two Bronze Star Medals, two Purple Hearts, and eleven Air Medals.

Air Force Cross citation (1st Award)

Kasler, James Helms
Major, U.S. Air Force
354th Tactical Fighter Squadron, 355th Tactical Fighter Wing, Takhli Royal Thai Air Base, Thailand
Date of Action: June 29, 1966

Citation:

Air Force Cross citation (2nd Award)

Kasler, James Helms
Major, U.S. Air Force
354th Tactical Fighter Squadron, 355th Tactical Fighter Wing, Takhli Royal Thai Air Base, Thailand
Date of Action: August 6, 1966

Citation:

Air Force Cross citation (3rd Award)

Kasler, James Helms
Lieutenant Colonel, U.S. Air Force
Prisoner of War, North Vietnam
Date of Action: June 1968 to July 1968

Citation:

See also

 List of Korean War flying aces

References

External links
 Civil Air Patrol Squadron named for Colonel Kasler

1926 births
2014 deaths
United States Air Force colonels
United States Army Air Forces soldiers
United States Army Air Forces personnel of World War II
United States Air Force personnel of the Korean War
United States Air Force personnel of the Vietnam War
American Korean War flying aces
American Vietnam War pilots
Shot-down aviators
Vietnam War prisoners of war
American torture victims
Recipients of the Air Force Cross (United States)
Recipients of the Silver Star
Recipients of the Legion of Merit
Recipients of the Distinguished Flying Cross (United States)
Recipients of the Air Medal
Aviators from Indiana
University of Nebraska Omaha alumni